Delfa Ivanić (6 March 1881 – 14 August 1972) was a Serbian painter, humanitarian and together with Slavka Subotić and Nadežda Petrović, one of the founders of the Circle of Serbian Sisters. She was also a translator, writer, editor of magazines and the first Serbian woman to receive Florence Nightingale Medal.

Biography

Delfa Ivanić was born in Podgorica, Montenegro, 6 March 1881. During the First Balkan War in 1912, with Walburga, Lady Paget, she established the VI Reserve Hospital for the wounded in Belgrade and in 1913, a hospital in Durrës, Albania. She founded the Serbian Support Society (Srpsko potporno udruženje) in 1915 in London. The society organized the housing of 500 Serbian schoolchildren in Oxford and Birmingham. Her humanitarian work took her to Thessaloniki, France, Trieste, and Rijeka. She returned to Belgrade in 1919. Throughout this period, she held lectures on the work of women's humanitarian societies in almost every city she found herself in during the war. She was the first Serbian woman to receive the Red Cross Florence Nightingale Medal in 1920. In 1962, she gave the Serbian Medical Society her medal. She worked as a translator, writer and editor of magazines. Delfa Ivanić was also involved in the building of the Center of the Circle of Serbian Sisters in Belgrade, which included a boarding school for girls. She was the president of the Circle from 1941 to its abolition in 1946. She died in Belgrade (at the time in SFR Yugoslavia), 14 August 1972.

Selected works
Uspomene, 2012.
Predavanje dr Keti Širmaherove i naše ženske prilike, article, 1906.
O srpskom narodnom ženskom savezu i njegovim zadacima, article, 1912.
Žena na domu, u društvu i u javnom životu, article, 1912.

References

Bibliography 
  
  
 
 
 
 

1881 births
1972 deaths
Artists from Podgorica
20th-century Serbian painters
Serbian humanitarians
20th-century Serbian writers
20th-century Serbian women writers
Serbian translators
Serbian women artists
Serbian magazine editors
Circle of Serbian Sisters
20th-century translators
Women magazine editors
Florence Nightingale Medal recipients
Writers from Podgorica